KJRF (91.1 FM) is a radio station  broadcasting a Christian radio format. Licensed to Lawton, Oklahoma, United States, the station serves the Lawton area.  The station is currently owned by The Christian Center, Inc.

References

External links
http://lawtonchristiancenter.org/wp/kjrf-91-1-fm/

JRF